The Eastern AAA Hockey League is a minor level ice hockey governing body.  The league is a sub-division of the Ontario Minor Hockey Association in the Canadian province of Ontario. The ETA playoffs are a best of 5 series. The final two teams advance to the OMHA Championships. It was established in 1990.

Teams
 North Central Predators (1996-1997)
 Barrie Jr. Colts (1994-1995)
 York-Simcoe Express (joined 1990-1991)
 Richmond Hill Stars (joined 1990-1991 -includes South Central Coyotes (now Richmond Hill Coyotes)
 Markham Waxers (joined 1990-1991)
 Ajax-Pickering Raiders (joined 1991-92)
 Central Ontario Wolves (joined 1992-93) 
 Whitby Wildcats (joined 1991-92) 
 Oshawa Minor Generals (joined 1990-1991)
 Clarington Toros (1999-2000)
 Peterborough Minor Petes (joined 1990-1991)
 Quinte Red Devils (joined 1990-1991)
 Kingston Jr. Frontenacs (1990-1991; left end of 1993 and re-joined 2007-2008)

External links
ETA Website
OMHA Website
Markham Waxers Hockey Club Website

2
Youth ice hockey leagues in Canada